Steven Strong (born 16 February 1993) is an Austrian ice hockey player for EC KAC in the ICE Hockey League (ICEHL) and the Austrian national team.

He represented Austria at the 2019 IIHF World Championship.

References

External links

1993 births
Living people
Austrian expatriate ice hockey people
Austrian expatriate sportspeople in Canada
Austrian expatriate sportspeople in the United States
Austrian ice hockey defencemen
Austrian people of Canadian descent
Belleville Bulls players
EC KAC players
Sportspeople from Villach
Saginaw Spirit players